Surprise, the first American naval ship of the name, was a sloop that the Continental Navy purchased in 1777. The Royal Navy had purchased a vessel named Hercules in 1776 and renamed her HMS Racehorse.  captured Racehorse in 1776 and the Americans took her into service as Surprise. Her crew destroyed Surprise on 15 December 1777 to prevent the Royal Navy from recapturing her.

HMS Race Horse
The Royal Navy purchased the sloop Hercules in June 1776 at Jamaica in the British West Indies. The Navy renamed her Race Horse and commissioned her under Lieutenant Charles Everitt. In August, Commander James Jones replaced Everitt.

On 6 December Racehorse was off Puerto Rico where she encountered Andrew Doria. After a two-hour single-ship engagement Racehorse struck.

US service
The US Navy commissioned Race Horse as Surprise under Captain Benjamin Dunn.

Surprise was ordered in April 1777 to join the brigantine USS Andrew Doria and sloop  in clearing the Cape May channel of British ships.

Scuttling
Surprise was stationed in the Delaware River through the spring and summer of 1777. After Vice Admiral Lord Howe brought his British fleet into the river in September 1777, Surprise was part of the forces charged with defending Philadelphia. Following the British occupation of Fort Mifflin on 16 November, Surprise, with the remaining ships of the Continental Navy, including Andrew Doria, sought shelter under the guns of Fort Mercer at Red Bank, New Jersey. With the evacuation of Fort Mercer on 20 November, Captain Isaiah Robinson of Andrew Doria gave orders the next day for the crews to burn their ships to prevent their capture. This was done shortly thereafter.

Citations and references
Citations

References

External links
 Royal Navy History

Ships of the Continental Navy
Age of Sail naval ships of the United States
1770s ships
Sloops of the Royal Navy
Captured ships